Tiruchirappalli is a Lok Sabha (Parliament of India) constituency in Tamil Nadu. Its Tamil Nadu Parliamentary Constituency number is 24 of 39.

Assembly segments
The Tiruchirappalli Lok Sabha constituency is composed of the following assembly segments: 

 
Before 2008 delimitation, it consisted of 
Musiri
Lalgudi
Srirangam
Tiruchirappalli - I
Tiruchirappalli - II
Tiruverumbur

Members of the Parliament

Election results

General Election 2019

General Election 2014

General Election 2009

General Election 2004

2001

General Election 1999

1998

See also
 Tiruchirapalli
 List of Constituencies of the Lok Sabha

References

 Election Commission of India

External links
Tiruchirappalli lok sabha constituency election 2019 date and schedule

Lok Sabha constituencies in Tamil Nadu
Government of Tiruchirappalli